Richard Ng (born 20 June 1966) is a Malaysian prelate of the Roman Catholic Church who has been serving as bishop of the Diocese of Miri since 2014. He was a priest in the Archdiocese of Kuching prior to his appointment as bishop.

Biography 
Ng grew up in Kuching in a normal Catholic family. He received his primary education at Catholic English Primary School and secondary education at St Joseph’s Secondary School. After finishing Form 6 in 1985, he worked as a site supervisor for one year, and a few months in a laboratory. In 1987, he studied at St Peter’s College Seminary in Kuching. He was ordained a priest of the Archdiocese of Kuching in 1995. He was sent to study Sacred Scriptures at the Pontifical Biblical Institute, Rome in September 1999. He obtained a Licentiate in Sacred Scriptures in 2003.

When he return to Kuching, he was posted to teach Sacred Scriptures at St Peter’s College. He also serve as a full-time formator for seminarians. In 2008, he was appointed the rector of St Peter’s College.

On 30 October 2013, Pope Francis has accepted resignation of bishop Anthony Lee Kok Hin, who resign due to mandatory age, and appointed Ng as the successor. He received his episcopal consecration on 25 January 2014 from his predecessor, Bishop Anthony Lee Kok Hin, with Archbishop John Ha Tiong Hock and Bishop Joseph Hii Teck Kwong serving as co-consecrators. On the same day of his episcopal ordination, he took the canonical possession of the Diocese of Miri.

References

External links 

Catholic-Hierarchy.org 

1966 births
Living people
People from Kuching
Malaysian people of Chinese descent
21st-century Roman Catholic bishops in Malaysia